The Schley County School District is a public school district in Schley County, Georgia, United States, based in Ellaville. It serves the communities of Ellaville and Murrays Crossroads.

Schools
The Schley County School District has one elementary school and one middle-high school.

Elementary school 
Schley County Elementary School

Middle-high school
Schley Middle High School

References

External links

School districts in Georgia (U.S. state)
Education in Schley County, Georgia